The men's long jump was an event at the 1992 Summer Olympics in Barcelona, Spain. There were 50 participating athletes from 37 nations, with two qualifying groups. The maximum number of athletes per nation had been set at 3 since the 1930 Olympic Congress. The event was won by Carl Lewis of the United States, the nation's third consecutive and 19th overall gold medal in the men's long jump. Lewis became the second man to win three medals in the event (after Ralph Boston) and the first to win three golds. Mike Powell repeated his silver-medal performance from 1988, becoming the eighth two-medal winner in the event. Joe Greene took bronze, completing the United States' second consecutive and fourth overall (1896, 1904, 1988) medal sweep in the men's long jump.

Background

This was the 22nd appearance of the event, which is one of 12 athletics events to have been held at every Summer Olympics. The returning finalists from the 1988 Games were two-time gold medalist Carl Lewis and silver medalist Mike Powell of the United States, fourth-place finisher (and 1984 bronze medalist) Giovanni Evangelisti of Italy, sixth-place finisher László Szalma of Hungary, and twelfth-place finisher Mark Forsythe of Great Britain. Lewis was looking for a third gold, but Powell had beaten him at the 1991 world championships (finally breaking Bob Beamon's 1968 world record of 8.90 metres with an 8.95 metre jump, as well as snapping Lewis's streak of 65 straight victories in the long jump) and the U.S. Olympic trials.

Burkina Faso, the Cayman Islands, El Salvador, Grenada, Guinea, the Seychelles, Slovenia, Sudan, and Zimbabwe each made their first appearance in the event; some former Soviet republics appeared as the Unified Team. The United States appeared for the 21st time, most of any nation, having missed only the boycotted 1980 Games.

Competition format

The 1992 competition used the two-round format with divided final introduced in 1952. The qualifying round gave each competitor three jumps to achieve a distance of 8.05 metres; if fewer than 12 men did so, the top 12 (including all those tied) would advance. The final provided each jumper with three jumps; the top eight jumpers received an additional three jumps for a total of six, with the best to count (qualifying round jumps were not considered for the final).

Records

The standing world and Olympic records prior to the event were as follows.

No new world or Olympic records were set during the competition.

Schedule

All times are Central European Summer Time (UTC+2)

Results

Qualifying

Final

See also
 1990 Men's European Championships Long Jump
 1991 Men's World Championships Long Jump
 1992 Long Jump Year Ranking
 1993 Men's World Championships Long Jump

References

External links
 Official Report
 Results

L
Long jump at the Olympics
Men's events at the 1992 Summer Olympics